Jazz Jamboree 1962 [No. 1] is a studio album by American jazz trumpeter Don Ellis recorded in 1962 and released on the Polskie Nagrania Muza label. The record was re-released in Poland in 2013 with the bonus track "Nihil Novi".

Track listing

Personnel
Don Ellis – trumpet 
Roman Dyląg – bass
Andrzej Dąbrowski – drums 
Wojciech Karolak – piano

References 

Don Ellis albums
1962 albums